Skate Down Under is an international figure skating competition. The inaugural event was held in August 2013 in Sydney, Australia. Medals may be awarded in the disciplines of men's singles, ladies' singles, pair skating, and ice dancing on the senior, junior, and advanced novice levels.

Senior medalists

Men

Ladies

Pairs

Ice dancing

Junior medalists

Men

Ladies

Pairs

Ice dancing

Advanced novice medalists

Men

Ladies

References

External links 
 International Skating Union
 Ice Skating Australia 

Figure skating competitions
Figure skating in Australia
Figure skating in New Zealand